Somerdale is an unincorporated community in northeastern Fairfield Township, Tuscarawas County, Ohio, United States.  It has a post office with the ZIP code 44678.  It lies along State Route 212, Conotton Creek and the Wheeling and Lake Erie Railway east of Zoar.

History
A post office called Somerdale has been in operation since 1887. Somerdale was originally a mining community and the Somerdale Coal Company operated there. Peak coal production at Somerdale was around the year 1900.

References

Unincorporated communities in Ohio
Unincorporated communities in Tuscarawas County, Ohio